Housefull is a 2010 Indian Hindi language comedy drama film directed by Sajid Khan and produced by Sajid Nadiadwala, The dialogues were written by Anvita Dutt while Nadiadwala wrote the storyline and Rameshwar S. Bhagat served as the editor. It became the first installment of the Housefull franchise.

The film stars Akshay Kumar, Riteish Deshmukh, Arjun Rampal, Lara Dutta, Deepika Padukone and Jiah Khan. The supporting cast consists of Boman Irani, Chunky Pandey, Randhir Kapoor, Lillete Dubey and Malaika Arora, with Jacqueline Fernandez featured in an item number. The film marked the last screen appearance of Khan, who died three years after its release on 3 June 2013.

The film was released worldwide on April 30, 2010, to mixed critical reviews, on over 750 screens in India. Nevertheless, it proved to be a commercial success. It emerged as the fifth highest-earning Bollywood film of 2010 only behind Dabangg, Golmaal 3, Raajneeti and My Name Is Khan according to its net collections of  domestically. The film went on to spawn three spiritual sequels–Housefull 2, Housefull 3 and Housefull 4–released in 2012, 2016 and 2019 respectively.

Plot
The story follows Aarush, an unlucky person, who works in a casino and gets money as people lose games of poker. After proposing marriage and being rejected by Pooja, a girl who he dearly loves, he then gets punched by her elder brother telling him to keep away from her. Aarush goes to London to stay for some time with his best friend, Bob and his wife, Hetal. Bob is a romantic person and loves his wife very much, both working at a casino owned by Kishore Samtani. Although at first, Hetal is unhappy with Aarush's presence, he proves to be a kind-hearted man looking for a family. Bob and Hetal decide to get him married to their boss' daughter, Devika Samtani. After the marriage, on their honeymoon in Italy, Devika leaves him for her longtime American boyfriend Benny. Aarush decides to commit suicide by drowning in the sea but is saved by a girl, Sandy, whom he kisses when she tries to make him breathe by giving him mouth to mouth.

Sandy originally thinks Aarush is a pervert but when Aakhri Pasta, the owner of Italy's "biggest" hotel where Aarush was spending his honeymoon with Devika, tells Sandy that Aarush is a widower as a joke and his wife died the day of their honeymoon, she befriends him and slowly falls in love with him. What she doesn't know is that Pasta was only joking. Aarush calls Bob and Hetal to Italy telling him about the entire situation. Sandy then tells them that she helped Aarush after the death of his "wife", both misinterpret the situation that Aarush lied to Sandy about the dead wife. Aarush later meets Devika and asks for divorce paper leading Sandy to find out his wife is alive and leave him. She does not allow Aarush to enter her room so he climbs her balcony. Pasta thinks Aarush is committing suicide and a live telecast is conducted. Sandy then switches on her TV and goes to her balcony but later when Aarush manages to clear the confusion, she accepts him.

The only way Aarush and Sandy can get married is by convincing her elder brother, Major Krishna Rao, a strict Indian Military Intelligence officer who loves his sister and is over-protective of her. Meanwhile, Hetal lies to her father, Batuk Patel, that Bob owns a mansion and they have a child, so she can meet him after so many years. On the other hand, Sandy tells her brother that Aarush is quite well to do too. The four are then forced to rent a mansion to make Hetal's dad believe that Bob owns it. Confusion prevails and somehow Batuk accidentally believes that Aarush is married to Hetal, and Bob is the cook. In the confusion, they bring an African child and pretend that it is the baby. Then, Krishna turns up earlier than expected, and much to Aarush's horror, Krishna was the one who punched him earlier for Pooja, leading to more lies and the two couples making him believe that Aarush owns the mansion.

For half of the term, the four must pretend that the mansion is owned by Bob, and the rest must pretend that Aarush owns it. Batuk and the Landlady are Aarush's pseudo parents while Hetal is his sister and Bob is his brother-in-law. An overly suspicious Krishna goes to the casino as his bag was exchanged with Kishore Samtani. Krishna then sees Bob and Hetal working at the casino and as soon as they spot Krishna, they hide from him. Krishna then uses a lie detector on Aarush to find the truth. But Sandy interrupts and proves with the detector that he loves her and Krishna forgives them. The whole family is invited to the Royal Palace to see Krishna get rewarded by the Queen of the United Kingdom. While this is happening, two workers, Santa and Banta Singh, are meant to be installing air conditioning gas for the place. However, instead, they accidentally supply the hall with laughing gas (nitrous oxide) causing everyone to break into an outburst of laughter. During this laughter, the truth is let out but no one seems to be in the right state of mind.

The two workers meanwhile stop the gas from spreading – everyone comes back to their senses. Aarush goes on stage to reveal the truth to Krishna about his ill fate and believes his engagement with Sandy is now broken. Krishna though believes Aarush is no longer a jinxed loser and instead orders him and Sandy to get married. In the end, Hetal and Bob live together with Batuk, who then marries the Landlady, and Aarush's luck changes for the better. After a song, Aarush says that nobody is a loser.

Cast
 Akshay Kumar as Aarush Awasthi
 Riteish Deshmukh as Boman "Bob" Rao: Aarush's best friend; Batuk's son-in-law; Maithili's grandson-in-law; Hetal's husband
 Arjun Rampal as Major Krishna Rao: Pooja and Sandy's elder brother
 Lara Dutta as Hetal Patel Rao: Batuk's daughter; Maithili's granddaughter; Bob's wife
 Deepika Padukone as Soundarya Venkateshwari Bhagyalakshmi Basappa Rao alias "Sandy": Krishna and Pooja's younger sister; Aarush's girlfriend
 Jiah Khan as Devika Samtani Awasthi: Kishore's daughter; Aarush's former wife; Sorman's girlfriend
 Boman Irani as Batuk Patel: Maithili's son; Hetal's father; Bob's father-in-law
 Lillete Dubey as Landlady / Mrs. Patel, Batuk's wife
 Chunky Pandey as Aakhri Pasta
 Randhir Kapoor as Kishore Samtani: Devika's father; Aarush's boss and former father-in-law
 Malaika Arora as Pooja Rao: Krishna and Sandy's sister; Aarush's former girlfriend
 Manoj Pahwa as Santa Singh
 Suresh Menon as Banta Singh
 Daisy Irani as Maithili Patel: Batuk's mother; Hetal's grandmother; Bob's grandmother-in-law
 Jacqueline Fernandez as Dhanno (cameo appearance in the song "Aapka Kya Hoga")
 Rajesh Kava as the voice of Prada, a talking parrot

Reception

Critical response
Anupama Chopra of NDTV said that it was impossible to take the characters seriously, and gave the movie a rating of 2/5. Rediff gave it a 1/5, calling its humour 'lame'. Rajeev Masand of CNN-IBN said 'Housefull' makes you cringe in embarrassment and disgust for what passes off as 'entertainment' and 'cinema' these days. Noyon Jyoti Parasara of AOL India gave it a 2 and said, "What annoys most about 'Housefull' is the fact that Sajid Khan claims this to be his tribute to greats like Manmohan Desai and Hrishikesh Mukherjee. Both have been great filmmakers and had their respective domains and Sajid's attempt at combining both ends up has him falling flat on his face." Gaurav Malani from IndiaTimes gave it 2/5 and said "Housefull is a slap on your senses as the film sticks to the slapstick genre in every literal sense.[...] There are some genuinely funny moments in the second half esp. Boman Irani sleepwalking through his portrayal of Gujarati Sholay. Unfortunately, it fails to salvage the harm caused by the bland, boring and banal first half. Housefull ends up being a painful experience." Raja Sen of Rediff.com gave a 1.5 out of 5 star rating explaining that "You may wonder if this film's a ripoff of any particular Hollywood DVD, but Sajid would probably say its his homage to Ben Stiller's worst films, picking plot points from Along Came Polly, The Heartbreak Kid and Meet The Parents."

In a rare positive review, Taran Adarsh of Bollywood Hungama gave the film a rating of 4/5, saying "Housefull is a complete laugh-riot, and is an entertainer all the way, targeted at the masses".

Box office

Upon release, the film had a good opening weekend of Rs. 410 million in India. This gave Akshay Kumar his biggest opening till date, beating Singh Is Kinng. Housefulls opening weekend was the second-highest opening weekend collection of all time, behind 3 Idiots. By the end of the first week, the film had collected Rs 498 million, the third-highest first week collection – behind 3 Idiots and Ghajini. It also broke the 2010 record of biggest first week, previously held by My Name Is Khan. Housefull debuted in the United Kingdom at number two and collected Rs 18 million on 55 screens in its opening weekend, while in the United States, the film collected Rs. 28 million on 82 screens in its opening weekend. After six weeks, the film netted Rs. 1.81 billion. The film was declared a hit by Box Office India.
Housefull 2010 total box office grossing crossed 1  billion mark.

Home media
Housefull was released in Blu-ray and DVD in October 2010.

Awards and nominations
6th Apsara Film & Television Producers Guild Awards
Nominated –  Best Comedian – Riteish Deshmukh

2011 Zee Cine Awards
Nominated
Best Director – Sajid Khan
Best Actor – Akshay Kumar
Best Supporting Actress – Lara Dutta
Best Comedian – Riteish Deshmukh
Best Music Director – Shankar Ehsaan Loy
Best Track of the Year – "Aapka Kya Hoga (Dhanno)"

IIFA Awards
Won
Best Performance in a Comic Role – Riteish Deshmukh

Stardust Awards
Won
Star of the Year – Male – Akshay Kumar
Best Supporting Actor – Arjun Rampal

3rd Mirchi Music Awards
Nominated
Best Item Song of the Year - "Aapka Kya Hoga (Dhanno)"
Best Song Recording - Abhay Rumde, Sameer Khan and Ashish Saksena - "Oh Girl You're Mine"

Controversies
P L Thenappan, the producer of the 1998 Tamil film, Kaathala Kaathala, filed a complaint with the Tamil Film Producers Council, alleging that producer Sajid Nadiadwala and director Sajid Khan had remade his film into Hindi without proper permission. In his complaint, Thenappan said, "I was shocked when I watched the Hindi film as nearly 60 per cent of the scenes from Kadhala Kadhala are there." He also stated that he was in talks with Nadiadwala about selling the remake rights more than a year ago and the deal did not go through.

The film also faced problems due to the remixed version of the song "Apni Toh Jaise Taise", originally from the 1981 film Laawaris directed by Prakash Mehra, music by Kalyanji Anandji. The Calcutta High Court restrained producer Sajid Nadiadwala from the cinematic use of the song.

Soundtrack
The film's soundtrack is composed by Shankar–Ehsaan–Loy. The lyrics are penned by Sameer and Amitabh Bhattacharya. The song "Aapka Kya Hoga" was a remake of the song "Apni Toh Jaise Taise" from the 1981 film Lawaaris.

Track list

Reception
The soundtrack was met with positive reviews. Abid of Glamsham said "Summing up, the album is another fun ride as we encounter one chartbuster after another, and hats off to the trio Shankar-Ehsaan-Loy, who have once again shown that they have the potential to compose as per the demand of the makers and the script" and gave the album 4 stars.

Samir Dave of Planet Bollywood gave 7.5 stars out of 10, stating "SEL deliver a fun 'n' frothy soundtrack that serves up a whole heaping spoonful of happiness." Joginder Tuteja of Bollywood Hungama gave the album 3.5 stars and stated "Housefull is a fun album and never takes itself too seriously to turn into a landmark affair that would be remembered for years to come. The songs are meant to be entertaining enough to fit in well with the film's narrative and not allow any full moment whatsoever to come in." Rudhir Barman of Sampurn Wire awarded the album 3.5 out of a possible 5 stars saying "The fast paced journey that everything is taking currently, it’s the survival of what works 'today'. In that aspect, 'Housefull' works and ensures that there won’t be any dull moment once the songs play on screen."

Sequel
See article: Housefull 2, Housefull 3 and Housefull 4

Producer Sajid Nadiadwala announced a sequel to the film on 30 September 2010. In September 2011, it was reported by director Sajid Khan that the film had begun filming. It features Akshay Kumar, Ritesh Deshmukh, Jacqueline Fernandez, Randhir Kapoor, Boman Irani and Chunkey Pandey from the previous film in new characters, whilst new additions include Asin Thottumkal, John Abraham, Zarine Khan, Shreyas Talpade and Shazahn Padamsee. It also stars veteran actors such as Rishi Kapoor, Mithun Chakraborty and Johnny Lever in supporting roles. Housefull 2 was released on 6 April 2012 and received a mixed response from critics. The sequel was more successful than the prequel and was declared a super hit at the box office.

Another sequel which is being directed by Sajid-Farhad would feature Akshay Kumar, Ritesh Deshmukh and Jacqueline Fernandez from the previous instalments in pivotal roles alongside Abhishek Bachchan, Lisa Haydon and Nargis Fakhri (the newest additions) was released on 3 June 2016.

References

External links

 
 
 
 
 
 

2010 films
2010s Hindi-language films
Films shot in Italy
Films shot in England
2010s buddy comedy films
Films set in country houses
Films set in England
Films set in Italy
Films scored by Shankar–Ehsaan–Loy
Films involved in plagiarism controversies
Indian buddy comedy films
Hindi remakes of Tamil films
Indian slapstick comedy films
Films directed by Sajid Khan (director)
2010 comedy films
Cultural depictions of Elizabeth II
Cultural depictions of Charles III